Fondoukia is a monotypic snout moth genus described by Pierre Chrétien in 1911. Its single species, Fondoukia translucidella, is found in Algeria.

References

Anerastiini
Monotypic moth genera
Endemic fauna of Algeria
Moths of Africa
Pyralidae genera